Ethyl cinnamate is the ester of cinnamic acid and ethanol. It is present in the essential oil of cinnamon.  Pure ethyl cinnamate has a "fruity and balsamic odor, reminiscent of cinnamon with an amber note".

The p-methoxy derivative is reported to be a monoamine oxidase inhibitor. It can be synthesized by the esterification reaction involving ethanol and cinnamic acid in the presence of sulfuric acid.

List of plants that contain the chemical
 Kaempferia galanga

References 

Ethyl esters
Phenyl compounds
Food additives
Flavors
Phenylpropanoids